Norteño or Norteña (northern), also música norteña, is a genre of Regional Mexican music. The music is most often based on duple and triple metre and its lyrics often deal with socially relevant topics, although there are also many norteño love songs. The accordion and the bajo sexto are traditional norteño's most characteristic instruments. Norteña music developed in the late 19th century, as a mixture between local Mexican music and Austrian-Czech-origin folk music.

The genre is popular in both Mexico and the United States, especially among the Mexican and Mexican-American community, and it has become popular in other Spanish-speaking countries as far as Colombia and Chile. Though originating from rural areas, norteño is popular in both rural and urban areas.

A conjunto norteño is a type of Mexican folk ensemble. It mostly includes diatonic accordion, bajo sexto, electric bass or double bass, and drums, and sometimes saxophone.

Repertoire
The norteño repertoire covers canción ranchera, corrido, ballad, bolero, chotís, cumbia, huapango norteño, mazurka, polka, redowa and waltz.

History

Origins

Emperor Maximilian I brought European music to México. By 1864 he had accumulated marching bands and musicians to entertain him. When Maximilian's empire was defeated, many of his former soldiers and fellow countrymen fled north and dispersed into what is now the southwestern United States. Norteño music developed from a blending of Mexican and Spanish oral and musical traditions, military brass band instrumentation, and Germanic musical styles such as polka and waltz.

European immigrants from Germany, Poland, and the Czech Republic to northern Mexico and the southwestern United States also brought dance traditions such as the varsovienne. The focus on the accordion in the music of their home countries was integrated into Mexican music, and the instrument is essential in the genre today. It was called norteño because it was most popular in the northern regions of Mexico.

The late 1910s and 1920s were the golden age of the corrido, a form of ballad. Mexicans on both sides of the border came to San Antonio, Texas, to record in hotels. Their songs memorialize the Mexican political revolution of the time. Los Alegres de Terán and Los Donneños were among the first norteño bands. Later in the century, the genre became more commercial with the works of Los Relámpagos del Norte and other groups. More recent bands such as Intocable integrate elements of rock music and other popular styles.

Modernization
Modern norteño has also diverged significantly from more original "oldie" norteño of pre-1950s artists such as Narciso Martínez. Since the 1970s and 1980s, most norteño bands have replaced the tololoche and snare drum with an electric bass guitar and a full drum set, respectively. The traditional bajo sexto-accordion style of Los Alegres de Terán and Los Donneños transformed into the modern style typical to that of Los Tigres del Norte, Los Tucanes de Tijuana, Intocable, and Duelo. In 2014, Los Tigres del Norte released the album Realidades, which contains the song “Era Diferente” (meaning “She Was Different”) about a lesbian teenager who falls in love with her best friend; according to lead singer and songwriter Jorge Hernández, this is the first time a norteño band has ever written a gay love song.

Regional variations
Northeastern Norteño: The most traditional style of norteño. Mainly popular in Mexico’s northeastern and central states, as well as in parts of the United States with large Mexican populations from said regions.

Pacific Norteño: Uses the same instruments as traditional northeastern norteño, but is played in a rougher manner, in part due to being influenced by banda music. Also, some bands use a piano accordion instead of the traditional button accordion. Mainly popular in the Mexican states that border the Pacific Ocean and  also the central states, as well as in parts of the United States with large Mexican populations from said regions.

Norteño-Sax: Incorporates an alto saxophone into the music, making it along with an accordion the primary instruments. Sounds closer to traditional norteño, but with an emphasis on the saxophone. Also, several bands are influenced by grupero music and incorporate an electronic keyboard for their ballads and romantic cumbias. Mainly popular in Mexico’s landlocked states, as well as in parts of the United States with large Mexican populations from said region.

Norteño-Banda: Replaces the bass with a sousaphone, instrument typically used in banda music for the low notes. Like pacific norteño, is mainly popular in Mexico’s pacific and central states, as well as in parts of the United States with large Mexican populations from said regions.

See also 
 Banda
 Grupera
 Latin Grammy Award for Best Norteño Album
 Mariachi
 Music of Mexico
 Narcocorrido
 Nortec
 Regional Mexican music
 Tejano
 Música Norteña: Mexican Migrants Creating a Nation Between Nations - Book about the genre

References

 
Mexican styles of music
Regional styles of Mexican music
Polka derivatives
Latin music genres
2000s in Latin music
2010 in Latin music